The Sunda Islands are a group of islands in the Malay Archipelago. They consist of the Greater Sunda Islands and the Lesser Sunda Islands.

Administration 
The Sunda Islands are divided among four countries: Brunei, East Timor, Indonesia and Malaysia. The majority of these islands fall under the jurisdiction of Indonesia. Borneo is part of Brunei, Indonesia and Malaysia. Timor is part of East Timor and Indonesia. Sebatik is part of Indonesia and Malaysia.

List of islands 
 Greater Sunda Islands
 Borneo
 Java
 Sulawesi
 Sumatra

 Lesser Sunda Islands (from west to east)
 Bali
 Lombok
 Sumbawa
 Sumba
 Komodo
 Flores
 Savu
 Rote
 Timor
 Alor Archipelago
 Atauro
 Barat Daya Islands
 Tanimbar Islands

See also 
 Banda Arc
 Komodo (island)
 List of islands of Indonesia
 Malay Archipelago
 Nusantara (archipelago)
 Sunda Arc
 Sundaland
 Sunda Trench

References

External links 
 
 Visible earth page on the lesser Sunda islands
  Map of a Part of China, the Philippine Islands, the Isles of Sunda, the Moluccas, the Papuans is a map from around 1760 featuring the Sunda Islands
 Historical 1767 Map of the Sunda Islands | Southeast Asia Digital Library

Archipelagoes of Indonesia
Archipelagoes of the Pacific Ocean

Malaya
Maritime Southeast Asia
Archipelagoes of Southeast Asia
Arcs of Indonesia
Geology of Indonesia
Islands of Indonesia
Volcanic arc islands